Nagasena Mahathera was the 9th Sangharaja of Bangladesh.

References

Bangladeshi Buddhist monks
Theravada Buddhist monks